Evi Rüegsegger (also known as Evi Attinger) is a former Swiss curler.

Teams

References

External links
 

Living people
Swiss female curlers
Swiss curling champions
Year of birth missing (living people)